Noel Biderman (born 1971) is a Canadian internet entrepreneur and business marketing specialist. Biderman has occupied roles as corporate President, CEO, COO and International Lead for businesses that have operated in 58 countries. Biderman is the former CEO of Avid Life Media and was the Chief Executive of parent company Ashley Madison. He is the CEO of Avenue insights, member of board of directors at Flowr Corporation and chief marketing officer of Bitbuy.

Early life and education 
Noel Biderman is a native of Toronto, Ontario. He was born Jewish and had a bar mitzvah ceremony. His grandparents were Holocaust survivors. Growing up in Toronto, he attended the York Mills Collegiate Institute in 1986, the University of California (economics) in 1989, and in 1996 graduated from York University's Osgoode Hall Law School.

Career 
Biderman, a former lawyer and sports agent, began his career in 1997 at Interperformances Inc., eventually becoming director of Canadian operations.

In 2000, Biderman began a position at Homestores Inc. (now Move.Inc.), eventually becoming General Manager of Canadian Operations.

In December 2005, Biderman began a position at Jump TV and was named Head of Product Development and Marketing.

Biderman became CEO of Avid Life Media and Ashley Madison in 2007.

Responding to critics, Biderman says that Ashley Madison does not promote infidelity, "We're just a platform. No website or 30-second ad is going to convince anyone to cheat. People cheat because their lives aren't working for them." He has said that he writes the commercials for his company (which have featured two attractive people in the throes of passion, and then the sign: "This couple is married...but not to each other"), which the LA Times called "hilarious." Biderman marketed Ashley Madison as having a focus on married women, instead of married men. "I was very confident that men would gravitate towards a service to conduct these otherwise anonymous affairs. They were seemingly doing it already," Biderman told BusinessWeek. "I was much less confident that women would behave that way." Biderman's concern was confirmed in the data breach of 2015 which revealed that less than 1% of the female users were ever active on the site, the 5 million accounts held by women "show so little activity that they might as well not be there".
In addition, the management of Maddison Ashley, had created approximately 70,000 fake female members, which were actually bots used to communicate with male members. The bots were focused on encouraging male members to buy credits so they could continue communicating with these fake female members.
Gizmodo journalist Annalee Newitz stated that the Bots would send out pre-programed messages to male members during 'Mistress Day', a pre-Valentines holiday on February 13, which was heavily publicised by Biderman.

In the summer of 2015, the Ashley Madison website was hacked and sensitive information of millions users was released publicly. Biderman was accused by the hackers of failing to delete accounts from the website even after customers paid to have accounts removed. Biderman's emails were also released. In the wake of the hack, on August 28, 2015, the Ashley Madison website announced that Noel Biderman had resigned as chief executive officer of Avid Life Media Inc.

As a former basketball, volleyball and football player, in 2012, Biderman started youth coaching the Metro Toronto Wildcats TAP program and led two age groups to 2 Provincial Championships. In 2013, Noel started coaching the North Toronto Huskies basketball team together with the Commissioner of the CFL, took his team to a Provincial Bronze medal and a silver medal.

Media appearances
Biderman has appeared on The Tyra Banks Show, The View, Larry King Live,
GluckRadio and Rogers TV's Daytime York Region.
Biderman also served as a judge for the Miss Tiger Woods mistress pageant on The Howard Stern Show, which was sponsored by Biderman's Ashley Madison.

In an interview with comedian Amy Schumer, Biderman states that wives gaining weight "is a legitimate reason" for husbands to seek sex outside their marriages.  He told Australia's "A Current Affair" program that if he found out that his own wife was accessing his cheater's site, "I would be devastated."

Speech and publication 
SmartCountry  (fiction), Cheaters Prosper and Adultropology (non-fiction)

Noel spoke at TEDx as a speaker and Big Think. He participated in a debate on family values at Fellowship Church with its pastor.

Personal life
Biderman is Jewish, as is his wife Amanda. He is the author of a book titled Cheaters Prosper: How Infidelity Will Save the Modern Marriage.

Biderman has played basketball, volleyball, football, tennis and hockey throughout the majority of his life.  He also collects ancient coins and first-edition novels.

Biderman married Amanda Biderman in 2003, and the couple have two children. Amanda is originally from South Africa, and has a background in marketing.  Prior to the hack, Biderman mentioned he is a happily married father of two and does not himself cheat. It has been alleged, through e-mails leaked during the hack, that Biderman carried on several extramarital affairs over the course of his marriage.

References

Living people
1971 births
Businesspeople from Toronto
Canadian Jews